Carlos Berlocq was the defending champion but decided not to participate.
Diego Schwartzman defeated Guillaume Rufin 6–1, 7–5 in the final to win the title.

Seeds

Draw

Finals

Top half

Bottom half

References
 Main Draw
 Qualifying Draw

Copa Topper - Singles
2012 Singles